Kirpa is a name which is used as a surname and a given name. People with the name include:

Given name
 Kirpa Ram (1916–1945), Indian military officer
 Kirpa Ram Punia, also known as K. R. Punia (born 1936), Indian politician
 Kirpa Ram Vij (1935–2022), Singaporean military officer and business executive

Surname
 Heorhiy Kirpa (1946–2004), Ukrainian statesman and politician
 Ivan Kirpa (born 1978), Russian boxer 

Surnames of Ukrainian origin
Indian masculine given names